M. A. Vaithiyalingam, is an Indian politician and was a Member of the Legislative Assembly of Tamil Nadu. He was elected to the Tamil Nadu legislative assembly from Tambaram constituency as a Dravida Munnetra Kazhagam (DMK) candidate in the 1989,  1996 and 2001 elections.
Three time MLA, who contested 5 times continuesly as DMK Candiidate in Undivided Tambaram Constituency (Now Tambaram constituency limits has been spread over and split as Tambaram, Solonganallur, Vellachery & Pallavaram Assembly constituencies) Official Spelling: M.A.Vaidialingam. In Tamil மீ.அ.வைதியலிங்கம்

References 

Dravida Munnetra Kazhagam politicians
Living people
Tamil Nadu MLAs 1996–2001
Tamil Nadu MLAs 2001–2006
Year of birth missing (living people)